When Vikings Attack! is a fighting video game by British studio Clever Beans. The game was released on November 6, 2012, as a downloadable game for the PlayStation 3 and supports Sony's cross-play feature on the PS Vita.  It is included on the "Best of PlayStation Network Vol. 1" compilation disc, released June 18, 2013.

Gameplay
When Vikings Attack! plays like an arena melee-brawler game.

The only weapons are thrown objects. Players control a small group of civilians fighting hordes of vikings. The objective is to pick up objects and throw them in order to knock out enemies. A single hit is required to knock out an opponent's troop. Each time an object collides with a figure, they're knocked out and excluded from the group, but larger or wide objects may even knock out an entire group, resulting in the player being eliminated. Lost civilians can be replaced by recruiting stray people roaming around the arena. The game also features special items to be thrown such as explosive bombs for an area of effect attack.

The game has a campaign mode supporting up to four player co-op. There's a multiplayer option with a few game modes such as last man standing and survival mode. The game also features collection extra for viewing collected citizens of different outfits and movies.

Reception
The game received mixed to fairly positive reviews. IGN gave the game a 6.5, praising the unique gameplay, but claims it gets repetitive after a while.

References

2012 video games
Fighting games
PlayStation 3 games
PlayStation Network games
PlayStation Vita games
Video games developed in the United Kingdom
Video games with cross-platform play
Video games set in the Viking Age